Knight Bachelor is the oldest and lowest-ranking form of knighthood in the British honours system; it is the rank granted to a man who has been knighted by the monarch but not inducted as a member of one of the organised orders of chivalry. Women are not knighted; in practice, the equivalent award for a woman is appointment as Dame Commander of the Order of the British Empire (founded in 1917).

Knights Bachelor appointed in 1920

Knighthoods announced in 1920 but where the date of investiture is unknown or after 1921 
It was announced on 1 January 1920 that Gerald Aubrey Goodman was to be knighted, but he was unable to attend the investiture ceremonies held before late March. He was styled as a knight in The Edinburgh Gazette in December 1920, when he was appointed Chief Justice of the Straits Settlement.

The Rt Hon. Richard Watkins Richards, the Lord Mayor of Sydney, was also included in the 1920 New Year Honours published on 1 January 1920, but no record of his investiture has been found in The London Gazette.

The following were announced in the New Year Honours for India on 1 January 1920; they were to be dubbed by the Viceroy of India at a later date, an event which was not recorded in The London Gazette; some were later dubbed by the king in 1921.

The following were announced in the New Year Honours for India on 5 January 1920; they were to be dubbed by the Viceroy of India at a later date, an event which was also not recorded in The London Gazette:

References 

Knights Bachelor
Lists of knights and dames
British honours system